There is no legal recognition of same-sex unions in Indonesia. Article 1 of the Law No. 1 of the Year 1974 on Marriage states unequivocally that marriage is "a physical and spiritual bond between a man and a woman as husband and wife, having the purpose of establishing a happy and lasting family founded on the Belief in God Almighty". Moreover, Article 2 states that a marriage is only lawful if it is in accordance with the laws of the religions of the respective parties. Meanwhile, Indonesians who have entered into same-sex marriage abroad are not allowed to register their marriage in Indonesia due to Article 1 of the Marriage Act. Additionally, Article 34(1) of the Law No. 23 of the Year 2006 on Civil Administration obliges all marriages to be reported to the local authorities within 60 days after marriage, and the explanation of Article 34(1) states that "marriage" can only be performed between a man and a woman.

Public opinion 
An online polling conducted by the International Lesbian, Gay, Bisexual, Trans and Intersex Association (ILGA) in October 2016 found that 69% respondents from Indonesia were against the legalization of same-sex marriage, while 14% supported it and 17% were neutral.

See also 
 LGBT rights in Indonesia
 Recognition of same-sex unions in Asia

References 

Indonesia
LGBT rights in Indonesia